Destri is a surname. Notable people with the surname include:

Jimmy Destri (born 1954), American musician
Maurício Destri (born 1991), Brazilian actor
Sonia Destri Lie, Brazilian dancer and choreographer

See also
Destro (surname)